Serbia and Montenegro Handball Super League was the highest-level national handball league competition in Serbia and Montenegro.

Champions

Results by teams

See also
 Yugoslav Handball Championship
 Serbian Handball Super League

References

External links
 Handball Federation of Serbia
 Handball Federation of Montenegro

Defunct handball leagues
Handball competitions in Serbia
Handball leagues in Montenegro